Josiah Moses Gondo (died 27 October 1972) was a Rhodesian politician, and a member of parliament (MP) from 1962 to his death. In May 1965, as leader of the United People's Party, he became the first black politician to serve as the Rhodesian House of Assembly's Leader of the Opposition.

Political career
Initially a member of the multiracial United Federal Party, Gondo first entered the Rhodesian House of Assembly as a member of parliament (MP) in 1962, soon after he won the "B"-roll seat for Ndanga in that year's general election. Within three years, following the break-up of the Federation of Rhodesia and Nyasaland at the end of 1963, Gondo had become leader of the all-black United People's Party, which won 10 of the 15 "B"-roll seats in the May 1965 general election. Since the governing, all-white Rhodesian Front had concurrently won all 50 "A"-roll seats, Gondo thereupon entered parliament opposite Prime Minister Ian Smith as the new Leader of the Opposition in the House of Assembly; he was the first black Rhodesian to hold this position.

During 1965, the British and Rhodesian governments quarrelled over the terms for the latter's full independence from Britain. Gondo opposed the sympathy widely held in the Rhodesian Front that a unilateral declaration of independence (UDI) might be necessary to preserve Rhodesian interests, predicting that a nationwide spate of lawlessness and violence would result. Speaking in early October that year, he suggested that he might withdraw his party from parliament in the event of UDI. "To lead the people of Rhodesia to think UDI would create a paradise is ludicrous," he said. Later that month, when British Prime Minister Harold Wilson was in the Rhodesian capital Salisbury for talks with Smith, Gondo urged Wilson to call a new constitutional conference.

After Salisbury declared independence unilaterally on the morning of 11 November 1965, Gondo continued as leader of the opposition, keeping his party in the House of Assembly. In stark contrast to his predictions of a chaotic bloodbath following UDI, life continued as normal in almost all corners of the country. A week after UDI, Smith invited Gondo to talk, but Gondo refused. On 25 November, the Rhodesian Legislative Assembly recognised the new constitution attached to the independence declaration, prompting protests from amongst the opposition; the independent "B"-roll MP for Highfield, Dr Ahrn Palley, a white man, was particularly clamorous in his interjections, prompting the Serjeant-at-Arms to eject him from the chamber. Gondo then led a walk-out of opposition MPs: eight other "B"-roll members followed him out. All ten of them returned in February 1966.

Gondo endured as leader of the opposition until 25 March 1966, when he was replaced as head of the United People's Party by Chad Chipunza. Gondo became Chipunza's deputy, but regained the leadership of the party and the parliamentary opposition within a few months. Following the Rhodesian government's rejection of terms drafted by Wilson and Smith aboard HMS Tiger in late 1966, Gondo called for the prime minister's resignation, arguing that this amounted to a vote of no confidence in Smith. This view was not shared by the government, however, and Gondo was ignored. On 21 January 1967, he was again replaced as leader of the United People's Party by Percy Mkudu.

Having switched his allegiance to the National Peoples' Union, Gondo retained his parliamentary seat in the 1970 election, winning in Kunyasi. He remained the MP for Kunyasi until his death on 27 October 1972.

References

1972 deaths
Rhodesian politicians
Year of birth missing
Members of the Legislative Assembly of Southern Rhodesia
Members of the Parliament of Rhodesia
United Federal Party politicians